The Prince of Lampedusa was a minor title in the Sicilian nobility.

The first prince of Lampedusa and Linosa was Don Giulio Fabrizio Tomasi, who received the title from Charles II of Spain in 1630. In the 1840s, the Tomasi family sold the island to the Kingdom of Naples.

The famous Italian novelist Giuseppe Tomasi di Lampedusa was the last in the line and he had long contemplated writing a historical novel based on the life of his great-grandfather, Don Giulio. When the Palazzo Lampedusa in Palermo was badly damaged during the Allied invasion of Sicily in 1943, Tomasi sank into a lengthy depression and began to write Il Gattopardo as a way to combat it.

References

Lampedusa e Linosa
Sicilian noble families
Tomasi di Lampedusa family